The appendicular skeleton is the portion of the skeleton of vertebrates consisting of the bones that support the appendages. There are 126 bones. The appendicular skeleton includes the skeletal elements within the limbs, as well as supporting shoulder girdle and pelvic girdle. The word appendicular is the adjective of the noun appendage, which itself means a part that is joined to something larger.

The organization of the appendicular system

Of the 206 bones in the human skeleton, the appendicular skeleton comprises 126. Functionally it is involved in locomotion (lower limbs) of the axial skeleton and manipulation of objects in the environment (upper limbs).

The appendicular skeleton forms during development from cartilage, by the process of endochondral ossification.

The appendicular skeleton is divided into six major regions:

 Shoulder girdle (4 bones) - Left and right clavicle (2) and scapula (2).
 Arms and forearms (6 bones) - Left and right humerus (2) (arm), ulna (2) and radius (2) (forearm).
 Hands (54 bones) - Left and right carpals (16) (wrist), metacarpals (10), proximal phalanges (10), intermediate phalanges (8) and distal phalanges (10).
 Pelvis (2 bones) - left hip bone and right hip bone (2).
 Thighs and legs (8 bones) - Left and right femur (2) (thigh), patella (2) (knee), tibia (2) and fibula (2) (leg).
 Feet and ankles (52 bones) - Left and right tarsals (14) (ankle), metatarsals (10), proximal phalanges(10), intermediate phalanges (8) and distal phalanges (10).

Through anatomical variation, the skeleton may have an accessory bone. Examples include sutural bones in the skull, cervical ribs, lumbar ribs, and a sixth lumbar vertebrae. Some occurrences are rarer than others.

The appendicular skeleton of 126 bones and the axial skeleton of 80 bones together form the complete skeleton of 206 bones in the human body. Unlike the axial skeleton, the appendicular skeleton is unfused. This allows for a much greater range of motion.

See also
Legs

References

 
Skeletal system